Scissurella supraplicata is a species of minute sea snail, a marine gastropod mollusk or micromollusk in the family Scissurellidae, the little slit snails.

Description
The height of the shell reaches 1 mm.  The shell has a heliciform shape. The thin spire is short, narrowly perforate, and semi-pellucid. It has a white color with a caducous rather thick pale olive epidermis. The spire consists of three whorls, the first ? (abrupt), the second a little convex, somewhat planulate above and radiately arcuately plicate. The body whorl is large, having a thin double carina (slit fasciole) a little above the middle, radiately arcuately plicate above the carina, below it with stride of growth. The large aperture is irregularly circular, and very slightly expanded at the basal margi. The peristome is continuous. The deep, narrow slit is situated between the two thread-like keels. (

Distribution
This species occurs in the Southern Indian Ocean off Kerguelen Islands.

References

External links
 To Biodiversity Heritage Library (16 publications)
 To Encyclopedia of Life
 To World Register of Marine Species

Scissurellidae
Gastropods described in 1875